Pulau Punjung is a town or Sub-district in Dharmasraya Regency, of West Sumatra province of Indonesia and it is the seat (capital) of Dharmasraya Regency.

Populated places in West Sumatra
Regency seats of West Sumatra